Ruairi O'Rahilly was a footballer from Co Kerry. He played football with Ballymacelligott and Kerry. He won an All Ireland Under 21 title with Kerry in 1996 and was part of the panel that won National League, Munster and All Ireland titles.

He played with his local Ballymacelligott club.

References

 http://munster.gaa.ie/winning-teams/u21f_teams/
 http://www.terracetalk.com/kerry-football/player/144/Ruairi-Rahilly

Year of birth missing (living people)
Living people
Kerry inter-county Gaelic footballers
Ballymacelligott Gaelic footballers